Brian Shimer (born April 20, 1962) is an American bobsledder who competed from 1985 to 2002. Competing in five Winter Olympics, he won the bronze medal in the four-man event at Salt Lake City in 2002.

Shimer also won three bronze medals at the FIBT World Championships with one in the two-man event (1997) and two in the four-man event (1993, 1997).

He won the 1992–3 Bobsleigh World Cup championships both in the four-man and the combined men's events.

Shimer retired after the 2002 Winter Olympics and became head coach of the US men's bobsleigh team. After the United States Bobsled and Skeleton Federation changed its coaching structure in May 2014 Shimer became head coach for both the men's and women's teams.

References

 Bobsleigh four-man Olympic medalists for 1924, 1932–56, and since 1964
 Bobsleigh two-man world championship medalists since 1931
 Bobsleigh four-man world championship medalists since 1930
 List of combined men's bobsleigh World Cup champions: 1985–2007
 List of four-man bobsleigh World Cup champions since 1985
 List of two-man bobsleigh World Cup champions since 1985
 CNN Sports Illustrated profile of 2002 US bobsled team
 IOC profile
 US Bobsled and Skeleton federation coaching staff

1962 births
American male bobsledders
Bobsledders at the 1988 Winter Olympics
Bobsledders at the 1992 Winter Olympics
Bobsledders at the 1994 Winter Olympics
Bobsledders at the 1998 Winter Olympics
Bobsledders at the 2002 Winter Olympics
Living people
Naples High School alumni
People from Florida
Sportspeople from New York (state)
Olympic bronze medalists for the United States in bobsleigh
Medalists at the 2002 Winter Olympics
American sports coaches
American Olympic coaches